is a Japanese comedian, actor, voice actor, television presenter, film director and film critic. He is nicknamed . He performs tsukkomi and make stories in the comedy duo Kyaeen. His partner is Udo Suzuki.

Amano is represented with Asai Kikaku. He graduated from Okazaki City South Junior High School, Aichi University of Education University High School and Nihon University College of International Relations International Cultural Department (now International Liberal Arts Department).

Filmography

Variety and information programmes

Current

Former
Only Amano himself

TV drama

Narration

Anime television

Dubbing

Films

Radio

Advertisements

Others

Works

Films
All of his works are directing.

Manga

Bibliography

Paperback

Magazine serializations

See also
Kyaeen
Udo Suzuki

References

External links
 

Japanese comedians
Japanese television presenters
Japanese male voice actors
Japanese film directors
Japanese film critics
Nihon University alumni
People from Aichi Prefecture
1970 births
Living people